Peter Kelleher (born 25 June 1946) is a former Fine Gael member of Seanad Éireann. He was elected to the Seanad in 1983 by the Labour Panel, and re-elected in 1987. He lost his seat at the 1989 election.

References

1946 births
Fine Gael senators
Members of the 17th Seanad
Members of the 18th Seanad
Living people